The Frisian Islands, also known as the Wadden Islands or the Wadden Sea Islands, form an archipelago at the eastern edge of the North Sea in northwestern Europe, stretching from the northwest of the Netherlands through Germany to the west of Denmark. The islands shield the mudflat region of the Wadden Sea (large parts of which fall dry during low tide) from the North Sea.

The Frisian Islands, along with the mainland coast in the German Bight, form the region of Frisia (German and Dutch: Friesland), homeland of the Frisian people. Generally, the term Frisian Islands is used for the islands where Frisian is spoken and the population is ethnically Frisian. In contrast, the term Wadden Islands applies to the entire archipelago, including the Dutch-speaking westernmost islands of Texel and Vlieland and Danish-speaking Danish Wadden Sea Islands further north off the west coast of Jutland.

Most of the Frisian Islands are environmentally protected areas, and an international wildlife nature reserve is being coordinated between the Netherlands, Germany and Denmark. Natural gas and oil drilling continue, however, and in the vicinity of the Ems, Weser and Elbe estuaries, and ship traffic causes tension between wildlife protection and economic values.

History

Origins
During the last ice age, which ended approximately 12,000 years ago, sea level was about  lower than it is now, and part of what is now the North Sea was dry land. With the melting of the ice caps, the sea level rose, reaching the current coast line around the beginning of the Holocene era, approximately 7,000 years ago. The sea broke through the dunes in many places to form the Wadden Islands, with the low-lying country behind becoming the tidal Wadden mudflats.

Island forming
The Dutch West Frisian and the German East Frisian Islands are barrier islands. They arose along the breakers' edge where the water surge piled up sediment, and behind which sediment was carried away by the breaking waves. Over time, shoals arose, which ultimately were only covered by infrequent storm floods. Once plants began to colonize the sandbanks, the land began to stabilize.

In contrast, the North Frisian Islands arose from the remains of old Geestland islands, where the land was partially removed by storm floods and water action and then separated from the mainland. They are, therefore, often higher and their cores are less exposed to changes than the islands to the south. Beyond the core, however, the same processes are at work, as is particularly evident on Sylt, where the south of the island threatens to be broken away and the harbour at List in the north silts up.
The Danish Islands, the next in the chain to the north, arose from sandbanks. Into the 20th century, silt on the islands was a serious problem. To protect them, small woods were planted.

Habitation
Long before the beginning of the modern era, there were already humans inhabiting the Wadden area. Up to 800 AD, most inhabitants lived on terpen (artificial mounds). Living conditions were difficult. The Roman naturalist Pliny, writing in the first century AD, described the Frisians as ...

... people who live without trees or shrubs. ... in the east, to the coasts of the ocean, a number of races in such needy conditions exist; but this also applies to the races of peoples which are called the large and small Chaucen, which we have seen in the north. There, two times in each period of a day and a night, the ocean with a fast tide submerges an immense plain, thereby the hiding ... whether the area is sea or land. There this miserable race inhabits raised pieces ground or platforms, which they have moored by hand above the level of the highest known tide. Living in huts built on the chosen spots, they seem like sailors in ships if water covers the surrounding country, but like shipwrecked people when the tide has withdrawn itself, and around their huts they catch fish which try to escape with the expiring tide. It is for them not possible to keep herds and live on milk such as the surrounding tribes. They cannot even fight with wild animals, because all the bush country lies too far away. They braid ropes of sedges and rushes from the marshes with which they make nets to be able to catch fish, and they dig up mud with their hands and dry it more in wind than in the sun, and with soil as fuel they heat their food and their own bodies, frozen in northern wind. Their only drink comes from storing rain water in tanks front of their houses. And these are the races which, if they were now conquered by the Roman nation, say that they will fall into slavery! It is only too true: Destiny saves people as a punishment.

Around 1000AD, dike construction began. Monks were instrumental in this activity, among others those of the monastery of Aduard. But earlier attempts had been undertaken to dam the sea. At the Frisian Peins (near Franeker), a 40-meter section of dike has been discovered that is thought to date from the 1st or 2nd century BC.

In the late Middle Ages, the dike system was gradually strengthened and flooding diminished. Beginning in the 17th century, dikes were built further out to reclaim more land. This activity peaked in the 19th and 20th centuries.

Conservation of the West Frisian/Dutch coast
The dunes south of the Wadden Sea were also liable to this process, but human intervention prevented the many storm surges from changing the coast of the provinces North Holland and South Holland into separate islands with Wadden mudflats behind them. However, around 1200AD, storm surges did break up the northern coast of Western Friesland into five islands. Around 1600AD, four of these along the West coast had been again recovered, but Wieringen, to the south-east of Texel, remained an island up to the 20th century.

Archaeology 
In April 2019, Dutch maritime investigators have unearthed a 16th-century shipwreck during an exploration for container ship MSC Zoe which lost in January 2019. According to Holland’s National Office for Cultural Heritage, the ship was built around 1540 in the Netherlands during the reign of Charles V. Researchers also found copper plates with emblem of the Fugger family and wooden beams with a sleek hull about 30 metres long.

Embankment of the mudflat
In Friesland and Groningen plans were made to embank and drain the Wadden Sea. As a result, the islands would have become part of the mainland. As of today, nature and environmental movements have been able to prevent this.

The only plan ever to be carried out was the construction of a causeway from the Frisian Holwerd to Ameland, in 1872, which was not very successful. Shortly after construction, the causeway had already suffered so much storm damage that the dam was abandoned in 1882. The dam has been almost entirely eroded since then.

In the northern Wadden Sea building dams proved to be considerably simpler. Nordstrand is now so much linked to the rampart by dikes that it is difficult to define it as an island, and also Langeness, Oland, Nordstrandischmoor, Hamburger Hallig, Sylt, and Rømø are all reachable by dams. Mandø is even reachable without a dam by means of tidal road.

Development

Migration
The Wadden Islands are in continuous apparent movement. The most important movement is the 'migration': the islands themselves are slowly but certainly moving from West to East. On the West side most of the islands disappear slowly into the sea and on the East side even larger sand-banks arise. This movement is also the reason that most of the villages themselves are on the West side of their island. When they were founded they were situated in the center. Over the course of the last few centuries, many houses and even entire villages disappeared into the sea.

Hook shaping
The second movement is the development of a hook shape. Along the sea breaches hook-shaped sand ridges arise, which change form with the moving of the sea arm. By growth of these hooks new shoals arise such as the Noorderhaaks and Zuiderhaaks. Sometimes such a shoal grows, originating where an island has been 'walking', and the island regains area.

Islands

Dutch Wadden Islands

(from West to East)

Inhabited
Texel (largest and most populous of all the Frisian/Wadden Islands)
Vlieland
Terschelling
Ameland
Schiermonnikoog

The Dutch islands have a surface of 405.2 km² and a total of 23,872 inhabitants.

Uninhabited
Noorderhaaks
Richel
Griend
Rif
Engelsmanplaat
Simonszand
Rottumerplaat
Rottumeroog
Zuiderduintjes

The names of all these places suggest this is the transition area between island and shoal (plaat in Dutch). Noorderhaaks, Rottumerplaat and Rottumeroog are generally considered to be islands, the others are considered to be sandbars and disappear from time to time into the waves. The former island of Wieringen can be found at the top of North Holland, against the Afsluitdijk.

German Wadden Islands

(from West to East and South to North)

Inhabited

Borkum
Juist
Norderney
Baltrum
Langeoog
Spiekeroog
Wangerooge
Neuwerk
Pellworm
Nordstrand (presently mainland)
Inhabited Halligen
Amrum
Föhr
Sylt

Uninhabited

Lütje Hörn
Kachelotplate
Memmert
Minsener Oog
Alte Mellum
Großer Knechtsand
Nigehörn
Scharhörn
Trischen
Tertius (frequently submerged)
Blauort
Süderoogsand
Norderoogsand
Japsand
Uninhabited Halligen (Habel, Südfall, Norderoog)

The German islands have a surface of 448.52 km² (173 sq. mi.) and 53,296 inhabitants. Although Heligoland (German: Helgoland) is not a Wadden Island, there are strong cultural links with the Wadden area; for example a dialect of North Frisian is spoken there.

Not all these islands are officially considered to be Wadden Islands. For the definition of an island, a minimum of 160 hectares (0.6 sq. mi.) must no longer be submerged during average high water by the North Sea.

Danish Wadden Islands

(from South to North)
Rømø
Mandø
Koresand (uninhabited)
Fanø
Langli (uninhabited)

In the 20th century, south of the Danish island Rømø lay the small island Jordsand, which sank in 1999. North of the Danish island Fanø the sand coast has been opened and closed numerous times in the course of history, but at the moment the coast line is closed, and forms a whole again except for two west coast fjords. The Danish islands have a total surface of 193.8 km² (74.5 sq. mi.) and 4,173 inhabitants.

Gallery

References

External links

Wadden.nl site with info about the Dutch Wadden Islands

 
Archipelagoes of the North Sea
Barrier islands
Frisia
Islands of Europe
Islands of the North Sea
Wadden Sea
International archipelagoes